John Jones  (1860 – 1902) was a Welsh international footballer. He was part of the Wales national football team between 1883 and 1884, playing 3 matches. He played his first match on 12 March 1883 against Scotland and his last match on 29 March 1884 against Scotland.

At club level, he played for as a forward for Berwyn Rangers.

See also
 List of Wales international footballers (alphabetical)

References

1860 births
1902 deaths

Place of birth missing

Date of death missing

Welsh footballers

Wales international footballers
Association footballers not categorized by position
Berwyn Rangers F.C. players